Root Sports Northwest is an American regional sports network owned as a 60/40 joint venture between the Seattle Mariners and Warner Bros. Discovery respectively, the latter of which operates it through its sports unit as part of the AT&T SportsNet chain of regional networks and as an affiliate of Bally Sports. Headquartered near Seattle in the city of Bellevue, Washington, the channel broadcasts regional coverage of sports events throughout the Pacific Northwest, with a focus on professional sports teams based in Seattle and Portland. It is available on cable providers throughout Washington, Oregon, Idaho, Montana, and Alaska and nationwide on satellite via DirecTV.

History
Root Sports Northwest was launched in late 1988 as Northwest Cable Sports, by Tele-Communications Inc. and Viacom. Early programming included games from Washington and Washington State Universities and Tacoma Stars soccer games. By 1989, it affiliated with the newly formed Prime Sports Network and was rebranded Prime Sports Northwest.

In 1996, News Corporation, which formed a sports division for the Fox network two years earlier after it obtained the broadcast rights to the National Football Conference and sought to create a group of regional sports networks, acquired a 50% interest in the Prime Network from Liberty. Later that year on November 1, News Corporation and Liberty Media relaunched the Prime Network affiliates as part of the new Fox Sports Net group, with the Seattle-based network officially rebranding as Fox Sports Northwest. The channel was rebranded as Fox Sports Net Northwest in 2000, as part of a collective brand modification of the FSN networks under the "Fox Sports Net" banner. Subsequently, in 2004, the channel shortened its name to FSN Northwest, through the networks' de-emphasis of the "Fox Sports Net" brand.

On December 22, 2006, News Corporation sold its interest in FSN Northwest and sister networks FSN Utah, FSN Pittsburgh and FSN Rocky Mountain to Liberty Media, in an asset trade in which News Corporation also 16.3% traded its 38.5% ownership stake in satellite provider DirecTV for $550 million in cash and stock, in exchange for Liberty Media's stake in the company. On May 4, 2009, DirecTV Group Inc. announced it would become a part of Liberty's entertainment unit, part of which would then be spun off into the separate company under the DirecTV name, in a deal in which Liberty would increase its share in DirecTV from 48% to 54%, with Liberty owner John Malone and his family owning a 24% interest. DirecTV would operate its newly acquired FSN-affiliated networks through DirecTV Sports Networks, a new division formed when the split off from Liberty Media was completed on November 19, 2009.

On December 17, 2010, DirecTV Sports Networks announced that its four Fox Sports Networks-affiliated regional outlets would be relaunched under the "Root Sports" brand. The network officially rebranded as Root Sports Northwest on April 1, 2011, with The Dan Patrick Show as the first program under the new Root Sports branding. For nominal purposes, the Root Sports networks continued to carry programming distributed mainly to the Fox Sports regional networks to provide supplementary sports and entertainment programming.

In April 2013, the Seattle Mariners announced that they would acquire controlling interest in Root Sports Northwest, as part of a long-term extension of its contract with the team through the 2030 season. DirecTV remained a minority stakeholder and controlling partner, and the network continued to operate under the Root Sports brand.

DirecTV was subsequently acquired by AT&T; on July 14, 2017, its sister networks were re-branded as AT&T SportsNet. Root Sports Northwest did not adopt the AT&T SportsNet brand, likely because AT&T is not the majority owner of the service. Nonetheless, Root Sports still introduced a rebranded version of AT&T SportsNet's new on-air graphics.

Ahead of their 2021–22 seasons, Root Sports Northwest acquired the regional rights to both the Portland Trail Blazers of the NBA, and the Seattle Kraken –a new NHL expansion franchise which began play that season.

In October 2021, Root Sports added an overflow channel, known as Root Sports Plus, to avoid scheduling conflicts with the Mariners, Kraken, and Blazers. Also that month, Root Sports, along with sister networks AT&T SportsNet Pittsburgh, and AT&T SportsNet Rocky Mountain, was removed from Dish Network satellite and Sling streaming TV services.

Despite the announcement that Warner Bros. Discovery would leave the regional sports network business in March 2023, Patrick Crumb, Seattle-based president of AT&T Sportsnet operations, stated that Root Sports would not be affected by the changes, presumably due to its majority ownership by the Seattle Mariners.

Programming

Seattle Mariners 
Root Sports holds the regional television rights to the Seattle Mariners of Major League Baseball, producing and televising over 150 live regular season games (out of 162 total), along with 30+ minute pregame and post-game shows that air before and after all telecasts produced by the network. Other Mariners programming on the network includes live Spring Training games, Mariners All Access, which includes both weekly editions during the regular season and several other in-season and off-season specials each year, and Mariners Mondays, a three-hour weekly program that airs during the winter months that highlights memorable games and moments from the past season.

Prime Sports Network began Mariners' broadcasts in 1994, with sixteen of the scheduled 88 televised games; the remainder were broadcast over-the-air on KSTW. A players' strike canceled the last quarter of the  season and the first several weeks of the  season.

Seattle Kraken 
Root Sports holds the regional television rights to the Seattle Kraken of the National Hockey League. Root Sports was announced as the team's inaugural regional television partner on January 26, 2021.

Portland Trail Blazers 
The Portland Trail Blazers of the NBA reached an agreement to carry games on Fox Sports Net Northwest beginning in the 2002-03 season, replacing the unpopular BlazerVision pay-per-views and team-run Action Sports Cable Network. This lasted until 2007, when the team signed with Comcast SportsNet Northwest (now NBC Sports Northwest).

When the Trail Blazers' contract was up for renewal in 2016, Root Sports outbid NBC Sports Northwest for the rights through the 2020–21 season. However, the team declined and renewed with NBC Sports Northwest instead, as Root Sports could not guarantee a carriage agreement with Comcast (NBCSNW's parent company).

In June 2021, it was announced that Root Sports had acquired the regional television rights to the Trail Blazers beginning in the 2021–22 season; the network's wider carriage, especially on streaming services and satellite, in comparison to NBCSNW was a factor in the acquisition. The timing of the deal was bad as Dish Network dropped all AT&T Sports Networks, including Root Sports, just before the start of the season on September 30.  All Trail Blazers telecasts are produced in-house by the team.

Seattle Seahawks 
ROOT SPORTS carries shoulder programming for the NFL's Seattle Seahawks, airing head coach Pete Carroll's weekly press conference, branded as Seahawks Press Pass, and the team's weekly magazine program, Seahawks All Access.

Utah Jazz and Vegas Golden Knights 
In Idaho and Montana only, ROOT SPORTS carries Utah Jazz and Vegas Golden Knights games and related programming produced by sister-network AT&T SportsNet Rocky Mountain on cable providers. DirecTV and streaming providers have access to those games by tuning to AT&T SportsNet Rocky Mountain.  Due to territory rights, neither Portland Trail Blazers nor Seattle Kraken games will air in these areas of Idaho and Montana.

Teams by media market

Collegiate programming 
In the winter, the network home to West Coast Conference basketball. Local WCC coverage is primarily focused on the Gonzaga Bulldogs and Portland Pilots, and includes both live games and The Mark Few Show, a weekly coaches' show for Gonzaga men's basketball. The network also airs Talkin' Ducks and Talkin' Beavers, insider programs featuring the teams of Oregon and Oregon State, respectively.

Former programming 
 Seattle SuperSonics basketball until the NBA franchise relocated to Oklahoma City (as the Oklahoma City Thunder) in 2008
 WNBA games from the Seattle Storm, before those games moved over-the-air to former sister television station KING-TV (on its 5.2 digital subchannel) and KONG-TV
 Athletic events from the Pac-12 conference (most often featuring Washington, Washington State, Oregon, or Oregon State) until those were moved to the Pac-12 Network in 2012 and Fox Sports 1 in 2013.
 Seattle Seahawks preseason football games
 Seattle University Redhawks men's basketball
 Western Athletic Conference football and basketball
 The Western Hockey League (2008-2015)
 Seattle Sounders FC and Portland Timbers soccer matches, full game replays, studio and insider programming (currently airs on Apple TV)
 Big Sky Conference football (now aired by Scripps TV affiliates)
 Great Northwest Athletic Conference men's and women's basketball
 Mountain West Conference football and men's basketball
 Washington Interscholastic Activities Association football and basketball, including championship games
 Oregon School Activities Association high school football championships

On-air staff

Current on-air staff

Gonzaga Bulldogs basketball/WCC basketball
 Greg Heister – Gonzaga and WCC basketball play-by-play
 Dan Dickau – Gonzaga and WCC basketball color commentator
 Richard Fox – Gonzaga and WCC basketball color commentator
 Francis Williams – college basketball color commentator and studio analyst

Portland Trail Blazers
Kevin Calabro – Trail Blazers play-by-play
Lamar Hurd – Trail Blazers color commentator
Brooke Olzendam – Trail Blazers sideline reporter
Michael Holton – Trail Blazers studio analyst

Seattle Kraken
 John Forslund – Kraken play-by-play
 J. T. Brown – Kraken color commentator
 Eddie Olczyk – Kraken color commentator 
 Piper Shaw – Kraken ice-level reporter
 Jen Mueller – Kraken fill-in ice level reporter
 Ross Fletcher - Kraken studio host
 Alison Lukan – Kraken studio analyst
 Nick Olczyk – Kraken studio analyst

Seattle Mariners
 Brad Adam – Mariners pre-game and post-game host, basketball play-by-play, studio host and sideline reporter (2000–present)
 Aaron Goldsmith – Mariners play-by-play announcer (2016–present) (currently he is the secondary Mariners Radio play-by-play announcer for Mariners Radio Network since 2013)
 Rick Rizzs  – Mariners play-by-play announcer (currently he is the lead Mariners Radio play-by-play announcer for Mariners Radio Network since 2011)
 Dave Sims – Mariners baseball play-by-play (2007–present)
 Mike Blowers – Mariners baseball analyst (2007–present)
 Dave Valle – Mariners baseball analyst (2010–present)
 Ryan Rowland-Smith – Mariners studio analyst
 Jen Mueller – host of Mariners All Access and sideline reporter (2007–present)
 Bill Krueger – senior baseball analyst (2000–present)

Others
 Angie Mentink – host of many of the network's magazine show and a sideline reporter (1999–present)
 Warren Moon – host of Seahawks All Access (2003–present)
 Tom Glasgow – football and basketball play-by-play (2008–present)
 Jason Stiles – football analyst (2006–present)
 Taylor Barton – college football color commentator and studio analyst

Former on-air staff
 Shaun Alexander – host of The Shaun Alexander Show (2002–2004)
 Cara Capuano – anchor/reporter (2004–2008)
 Brian Davis – NBA host (2004–2008, now Oklahoma City Thunder play-by-play announcer for Fox Sports Oklahoma)
 Jason Gesser – football analyst and contributor for Cougars All Access (2009–2011)
 Dave Niehaus – Mariners play-by-play announcer (died on November 10, 2010)
 Don Poier – play-by-play announcer (died on January 21, 2005)
 Kerry Sayers – anchor/reporter (2002–2004, now at WSCR and WFLD in Chicago)
 John Strong – Portland Timbers play-by-play (2007–2013)
 Mack Strong – college football analyst and host of Mack Strong: Seahawks Insider (2008–2011)
 Sonny Sixkiller – college football analyst
 Lenny Wilkens – NBA expert and college basketball analyst (2006–2013)
 Nicole Zaloumis – sideline reporter (2008–2010, now with Sirius XM Radio)
 Vinnie Richichi – Mariners sideline reporter

Portland Timbers
 Jake Zivin – Timbers play-by-play, host of Timbers in 30
 Ross Smith – Timbers color commentator
 Nat Borchers – Timbers color commentator
 Samantha Yarock – Timbers sideline reporter

Seattle Sounders
 Keith Costigan – Sounders FC play-by-play
 Matt Johnson – Sounders FC play-by-play
 Kasey Keller – Sounders FC color commentator
 Steve Spanish – Sounders FC color commentator

Carriage 
On September 30, 2021, Dish Network's carriage agreements for Root Sports Northwest, and AT&T SportsNet Pittsburgh and Rocky Mountain expired.

References

External links
 

Cable television in the United States
AT&T SportsNet
Fox Sports
Prime Sports
Fox Sports Networks
Television channels and stations established in 1988
1988 establishments in Washington (state)
Bally Sports
Turner Sports